Salvador Aguirre may refer to:

Salvador Aguirre (film director), Mexican film director of 2002 Cannes Film Festival
Salvador Aguirre (Honduras) (1862–1947), former President of Honduras
Salvador Cabrera (born 1973), full name Salvador Cabrera Aguirre, Mexican professional football midfielder